The Antelope Valley Project is a flood control, economic development, transportation and community revitalization project in Lincoln, Nebraska. Centered on the flood control channel provided for Lincoln's Antelope Creek, the project is planned to run from just beyond J Street in the South to Salt Creek to the North, with the creek fully contained within the channel. The total cost of the project is $238,000,000. The project is the largest public works project in the history of the city.

Overview 

Lincoln's Antelope Valley Project creates a fresh aesthetic and a critical infrastructure complex. Everything centers on the 'wandering' and occasionally flooded Antelope Creek—now with the Project's new waterway as a control. A Project design/map can be found at: http://www.lincoln.ne.gov/city/pworks/projects/antelope/phasing/pdf/phasing.pdf.

The Project creates a green belt of parkland in the heart of the city. Vehicular and pedestrian bridges add utility and a post modern aesthetic. Other project features include: Antelope Valley Parkway, a vehicular traffic way running from Cornhusker Highway South via the Parkway merging into Capital Parkway; a major vehicle arterial running from 27th Street West via State Fair Road merging into Salt Creek Roadway at the 'big X' and onto 9th Street; miles of recreational trails connected to an extensive city trail network; rail, pedestrian and vehicular bridges across the waterway; Trago Park and Union Plaza, both interactive water venues: access to the University of Nebraska-Lincoln campus and the planned UNL research park through pedestrian and bicycle trails, bridges as well as major vehicular parkways, enumerated above.

"Project waterway" 

The waterway carries the 100-year flood run-off. It centers on the new grass-lined Antelope Creek waterway. To create the channel, the Corps of Engineers designed and managed a 'big dig'--miles in length. Water flows North into the larger Salt Creek. Aside from providing the channeling complex for the last miles of the creek, the waterway connects on the South directly with Antelope Creek as it flows from Holmes Lake to the Southeast.

On May 7, 2015, the city of Lincoln experienced its worst flood in recent history, following over six inches of rain beginning the night of May 6, 2015. In areas near the waterway, rain water and flood water was largely contained in the waterway, as was intended by its design. Though flooding in other areas of the city submerged cars and prevented driving, traffic flowed freely on the bridges and roads along the waterway. The waterway also channels excess flow from Salt Creek, mitigating the chances of the water level of Salt Creek from exceeding the levee height. On May 7, Salt Creek water levels were declared dangerously near its maximum; it is likely that without the Antelope Valley waterway providing this channel, water from Salt Creek may have spilled over and led to much heavier flooding in a large tract of land along the Creek, which contains many residences. Though critics of the project decried its high price tag, the waterway's worth was tested and proven by the response to this storm.

Union Plaza 
Union Plaza is a large urban park built as part of the Antelope Valley Project. The construction of Union Plaza cost 4.75 million dollars, and was completed in September 2012. Plaza architects intended elements of the park such as multilevel water features and colored wave embedded pavement to thematically reflect. The Plaza includes the Lincoln amphitheater, a water plaza with fountains and ponds, festival areas, play areas, sculptures, a scenic overlook, gathering spots, and event parking. All of this—the ponds, major fountains and other water features create a unique, experience. Anticipated surrounding the Plaza are: restaurants, shops, offices, other businesses, housing and a possible UNL Research Park extension (*under construction—completion 2010).

The  park runs along both the East and West sides of the waterway from O Street, North to R Street (between 21st and 22nd streets. Union Bank & Trust Company contributed substantially to the Plaza (2008).

( ** See the Clark Enersen Partners design slideshow at: http://www.journalstar.com/articles/2007/09/24/special_reports/2015/doc45b0e88fda439352645014.txt#image )

Auto parkway 
Relocating crowded city streets is a significant element of a three-part major arterial project.

Part I. Antelope Valley Parkway provides a six-lane traffic way running the length of and parallel to the waterway (West side).* Bridges criss-cross the channel at Military Road, 'Big Y,' Y, Vine, Q, P, O*, N** and J* streets. Bridges and overpasses provide access to UNL on the West, to the UNL research park on the East, to arterials and to streets.

Part II. At S Street, the arterial breaks away from the channel and follows 19th Street southward, connecting Antelope Valley Parkway with Capitol Parkway at K and L streets **. The resulting  merged arterials will continue on Southeast to Capitol Parkway end (at 48th Street).

Part III. The 27th Street/9 Street connection creates a continuous East/West parkway from 27th Street (East entrance), connecting State Fair Road to Salt Creek Parkway*, intersecting with Antelope Valley Parkway at 'the Big X,' and continuing onward to merge into 9th street on the West*. (*under construction) (**construction pending)

Hike and bike trails 
Running parallel to the Parkway, pedestrian walkways and trails provide the city and the university area extensive walking and biking trails. The Project extends and partially comprises the extensive Trails in Lincoln, NE. It contains an elaborate trail component—a hub for Lincoln's trail network—trail extensions and more. Trails extend the length of the channel *, connecting to Union Plaza *; to channel bridge crossings; to the future UNL research park*; to the downtown UNL campus and Devaney Sports Complex; to new trails outside the channel, e.g. from J Street, to Randolph *; and to existing trails including Jaimaca North, Dietrich, Salt Creek Levee Trail; Oak Lake and Rock Island trails; various on street trail connections and other trails/trail extensions *. A MoPac Trail extension * runs between the Parkway on the West to 27th and beyond on the East (between W and Y streets). A MoPac trail overpass crosses 27th.   (*under construction)

Urban revitalization 
Urban revitalization stands as a major Antelope Valley Project goal. A revitalization corridor runs form N Street North to Holdridge. Plans include the development of residential and office/retail complexes.  To date, numerous multi-family housing units have been constructed in an area from the channel North on Vine and East to 27th. The first known Antelope Valley entrepreneurial projects are: Shannon Narner's, Hoppe Partners development between K and L streets and 19th/20th and Rick Krueger's commercial development begun in late 2008. Further development could await completion of pending city development standards. Related to those standards and project requirements, forty plus structures have been removed to make-way for the project. Additional removals are planned as projects, such as the Antelope Valley Parkway, near completion.

Project aesthetic 

The Project creates a 'green belt' sprawling across the center of the city.  Architecture is water-themed throughout. Wave themes, curves and circles predominate design—inlaid into paving, in ponds, in the amphitheater, on retaining walls. The water/wave/nautical theme is melded with post-modern design. Landscape*  features 'low water/low maintenance' vegetation. Throughout, both deciduous and evergreen trees dot hike/bike trails and trafficways. Channel banks are grass and grass/cement waffled surfaces. When complete, decorative grasses, flowering shrubs and ground cover will line the trails, waterway and vehicular traffic ways. Bridge design angles, 'metal work' and lamps speak post modern. Retaining walls, while more modern than 'post modern,' are 'designed,' not merely 'poured.' Waved pebbles overlaid with leaves and shells sculpt curved wall faces. (*in process)

Project post-modern/water architecture has spread beyond its borders. Architectural and water themes are tentatively included in the UNL research park (park video flyover: http://www.unl.edu/ucomm/chancllr/nicampus/). To the West the Harris Overpass reflects similar design. To the Southeast, the South Street Bridge (38th and South) will continue the design theme.

Nebraska Innovation Campus/UNL Research Park 
The planned Nebraska Innovation Campus is a $50 million public/private development partnership of the University of Nebraska-Lincoln. This research campus will add to UNL's substantial national research reputation. When complete, the Campus will comprise a sprawling complex of laboratories, ponds and extensive 'green' landscapes stretching throughout the current State Fair Park. Some plans suggest a research development corridor extending as far south as K and L streets. In 2008, the Nebraska Legislature (unicameral) voted to move the Nebraska State Fair to Grand Island, Nebraska, pending funding. Beginning in 2010, the current fair site will gradually 'morph' into the Nebraska Innovation Campus. By late 2008, the first park tenant has been found and other potential park occupants were initially identified and screened from among a numerous interested parties. Initial Federal funding, $1.4 million has been secured. The Antelope Valley Project will provide unexpected research park benefits: two pedestrian bridges, waterway walk/hike/bike trails, cross-creek vehicle bridges—all providing city campus access to the UNL research park and the Bob Devaney Sports Complex.

The Antelope Valley Project is a partnership between the University of Nebraska-Lincoln, the City of Lincoln and the Natural Resources District (Lower Platte South).

References 

Transportation in Lincoln, Nebraska
Geography of Lincoln, Nebraska
Proposed infrastructure in the United States